Alpha Phi Delta, commonly referred to as APD, is a Greek social fraternity that evolved from an exclusive Italian society, initially known as Il Circolo Italiano ("The Italian circle"), established at Syracuse University in 1914.

Founding
Seven students created the fraternity that would last long after their college days. They were Cesidio A. Guarini,  Ferdinand F. DiBartolo, Anthony T. Frascati, Nicholas Frunzi, Otto Gelormini, Dominic T. Ciolli, and Joseph Cangiamila.

Soon after its founding, Alpha Phi Delta spread from Syracuse and became a national fraternity. Alpha Phi Delta was traditionally an Italian-heritage fraternity. Since 2 September 1965, it accepts young men of all ethnic backgrounds.

History
After the creation of the Alpha chapter at Syracuse University, Nicholas Frunzi transferred to Columbia University in 1916. He became friends with members of the fraternity  Sigma Gamma Phi that had similar values as Alpha Phi Delta. After Frunzi convinced the founding members of Sigma Gamma Phi to merge, Columbia University became the "Beta chapter" of Alpha Phi Delta, which, thus, became a national fraternity. As time passed the fraternity grew bigger. In 2015, the fraternity reached 20,000 lifelong members.

In 2016, the fraternity voted to leave the North-American Interfraternity Conference due to concerns over NIC's near-quadrupling of fees, its stripping of smaller fraternities from having voting privileges, and other grievances.

Active Chapters and Colonies
Pi: West Virginia University
Chi: Pennsylvania State University
Psi: Duquesne University
Beta Beta: Manhattan College
Theta Beta: New York University
Beta Eta: Brooklyn College
Beta Theta: Franciscan University of Steubenville
Beta Iota: Utica College
Beta Lambda: St. Francis University
Beta Xi: New Jersey Institute of Technology
Beta Omicron: Youngstown State University
Beta Pi: St. John's University (Queens Campus)
Beta Rho: Gannon University
Beta Sigma: St. Francis College
Beta Phi: Rowan University
Gamma Iota: Pace University (Pleasantville Campus)
Gamma Kappa: College of Staten Island
Gamma Mu: The Richard Stockton College of New Jersey
Gamma Nu: William Paterson University Permanently Barred since March 2018 
Gamma Xi: Southern Connecticut State University
Gamma Omicron: S.U.N.Y at Stony Brook
Gamma Pi: Ramapo College of New Jersey
Gamma Sigma: St. John's University, Staten Island Campus
Delta Beta: Rutgers University, New Brunswick Campus
Delta Epsilon: John Jay College of Criminal Justice
Delta Theta: Mid Hudson Region
Delta Xi: Seton Hall University
Delta Rho: State University of New York - College at Oneonta
Delta Upsilon: Robert Morris University
Delta Chi: University of Colorado
Delta Psi: Lynn University
Epsilon Beta: La Salle University
Epsilon Gamma: St. Joseph's College (Patchogue Campus)
Epsilon Delta: Montclair State University
Epsilon Epsilon: Farmingdale State College
Epsilon Zeta: St. Joseph's College (Brooklyn/Patchogue, New York)
Epsilon Eta: University at Albany, SUNY
Epsilon Iota: Centenary University
Epsilon Lambda: University of New Haven
Epsilon Nu: Penn State Altoona 
Epsilon Xi: Vaughn College of Aeronautics and Technology 
Epsilon Omicron: Fitchburg State University
Epsilon Pi: State University of New York at Cortland
Epsilon Sigma: State University of New York at New Paltz
Briarcliff College Colony
Dowling College Colony
Misericordia University Colony

Alpha Phi Delta is the top represented fraternity in the New York City Tri-State Area, and among the top on the East coast.

Notable Brothers

 Al DeMao, professional football player, Washington Redskins
 Joe DeNardo, Emmy-winning Pittsburgh meteorologist
 Aldo Donelli, professional football player, Pittsburgh Steelers
 Orlando DiGirolamo, jazz musician
 Vincent D'Onofrio, honorary member, actor, Law And Order: Criminal Intent, Full Metal Jacket, and Men in Black 
 Harvey Golub, former CEO of American Express; current CEO of the American International Group
 Henry Mancini, honorary member; Academy Award-winning musician
 Ray Mancini, honorary member; two-time world boxing lightweight champion
 Armand Niccolai, professional football player, Pittsburgh Steelers
 John A. Notte, Jr., Governor of Rhode Island, 1961–63
 Ralph Penza, NBC news anchor
 Joey Powers, composer and musician; had Top 10 1964 Hit "Midnight Mary"
 George Rado, professional football player, Pittsburgh Steelers
 Mark Rodak, professional football player, Pittsburgh Steelers, Cleveland Rams, 1939-1942; Case Western University
 Alfred Edward Santangelo, U.S. Representative from New York 18th District, 1957–63
 Frank Sinatra, honorary member; singer and actor
 Pete Van Wieren, former announcer for the Atlanta Braves
 Silvio Zaninelli, professional football player, Pittsburgh Steelers
 Anthony Sciarratta, author
 Sal Vulcano, comedian and actor.

See also
List of social fraternities and sororities

References

External links
Alpha Phi Delta national website
Alpha Phi Delta Foundation - charitable foundation website

Student organizations established in 1914
Student societies in the United States
North American Interfraternity Conference
Italian-American culture in New York (state)
Italian-American organizations
1914 establishments in New York (state)